James Fred Young, known as Fred Young, was the seventh president of Elon University, a private liberal arts university located in Elon, North Carolina. Young served as president of Elon from 1973 to 1998. He was succeeded by Leo Lambert.

Young grew up in Burnsville, North Carolina. He attended Mars Hill College and Wake Forest University, received his master's degree in education administration from UNC-Chapel Hill, and received his doctorate from Columbia University. After serving as a principal, assistant superintendent, and superintendent, he was named president of Elon.

Young has been credited with transforming Elon from a regional institution serving average students into a selective institution with a national reputation.

References

Presidents of Elon University
Living people
People from Alamance County, North Carolina
Year of birth missing (living people)